Thomas Hamilton (10 February 1893 – 25 December 1959) was a Scottish footballer who played as a right back, primarily for Kilmarnock and Preston North End.

He was a Scottish Cup winner with Kilmarnock in 1920, was selected for the Scottish Football League XI in January 1921, joined Preston for what has been quoted as a then-record transfer fee of £4,600 a month later, and played in the FA Cup final of 1922 (a defeat to Huddersfield Town). After eight years at Deepdale, Hamilton later featured for Manchester Central and Great Harwood.

References

1893 births
1959 deaths
Association football defenders
Scottish Junior Football Association players
Kilmarnock F.C. players
Cronberry Eglinton F.C. players
Scottish Football League players
Scottish Football League representative players
Scottish footballers
English Football League players
Preston North End F.C. players
Manchester Central F.C. players
Great Harwood F.C. players
Footballers from East Ayrshire
FA Cup Final players